Love Fiction is a 2012 South Korean romantic comedy film written and directed by Jeon Kye-soo, and starring Ha Jung-woo and Gong Hyo-jin.

Plot 
Goo Joo-wol (Ha Jung-woo) is a novelist (and part-time bartender) suffering writer's block and he has not been able to write anything for the past couple of years. A hopeless romantic, he looks to find artistic inspiration in every woman he meets, but ends up only with despair and heartache. One day, his publisher asks him to come along to a book fair in Germany for a change of pace. There he meets Hee-jin (Gong Hyo-jin), a film distributor who is there to survey the European film market at an event in Berlin. Unsurprisingly, he falls in love instantly, and upon returning to Seoul, he writes her a love letter displaying his odd sense of humor, which convinces her to go out on a date with him. As their relationship progresses, Joo-wol writes a bestselling pulp noir serial with a main character loosely based on Hee-jin. However, with this newfound popularity he begins to discover more than he would like to know about his girlfriend's complicated history with men.

Cast 

 Ha Jung-woo as Goo Joo-wol / Detective Ma Dong-wook
 Gong Hyo-jin as Lee Hee-jin / Kim Hae-young
 Jo Hee-bong as Publisher Kwak / Detective squad chief Kwak
 Lee Byung-joon as M
 Ji Jin-hee as Goo Joo-ro, Joo-wol's older brother
 Yoo In-na as Soo-jung / Kyung-sook
 Kim Ji-hoon as Hwang / Detective Ryu
 Seo Hyun-woo as Yi-gyu
 Choi Doo-ri as Kyung-ja 
 Kwak Do-won as Director Hwang / Murdered senator
 Kim Seong-gi as Dr. Pyo
 Choi Yu-hwa as Min-ji / Veronica
 Park Young-soo as Young-shik / Director Jo
 Jo Yong-joon as Sysop
 Lee Jun-hyeok as Professor Jeong
 Kim Hye-hwa as Ma-yi
 Kim Jae-hwa as Joo-hee
 Park Joon-myun as Baek Sun-young
 Choi Won-tae as Baek Seon-il 
 Kang Shin-cheol as Hee-jin's ex-husband
 Son Byung-wook as Joo-wol's high school gym coach
 Jeon Su-ji as art teacher
 Kim Hye-ji as beauty salon hairdresser
 Chi Woo as Joo-wol as a high school teen
 Yeom Hyun-seo as little girl Ye-ja

Production 
This is Jeon Kye-soo's third feature film following his 2006 debut Midnight Ballad for Ghost Theater (a surreal musical comedy that won the Baeksang award for Best New Director), the short film U AND ME in the 2008 omnibus If You Were Me 4, and 2010's Hong Sang-soo-style indie Lost and Found.

With a background in stage and dance, Jeon said he was inspired by French director Jean-Pierre Jeunet and his 1991 film Delicatessen to become a director.

The script was completed in 2007 but Jeon couldn't find anyone to invest in the unconventional romantic comedy, largely because industry insiders considered the plot to be too difficult for the general public to understand. The script was written for Ha Jung-woo and he committed to the film from the beginning, but Jeon said, "We had this good actor Ha Jung-woo but investors changed their minds because they thought the script lacked widespread appeal and the public wouldn’t like or understand it."

Jeon first met producer Eom Yong-hoon while making Midnight Ballad for Ghost Theater and the two developed a friendship. When production of Love Fiction was cancelled in 2009, Eom sold his apartment in order to launch his own production company Samgeori Pictures because he wanted to develop Jeon's script into a film. (Eom also produced 2011's surprise hit The Crucible.)

Filming began in 2011, with Gong Hyo-jin replacing Kang Hye-jung as the leading lady.  Jeon said of Ha and Gong, "They were perfect in many ways. They gave us their best in just a couple of takes. I couldn’t have asked for more than that."

Explaining the puzzling name of Goo Joo-wol, Jeon said "I find the (name's) sound important. It has that sound of a character that steps out the door of his house at around 2 p.m. in his pajamas, loitering about without doing much, like a neighborhood rogue complaining about society."

Similar to the fantastical style of Cédric Klapisch's Auberge Espagnole, Joo-wol's complex inner side is displayed through conversations shared with an imaginary character 'M'. In making Joo-wol the focus, the film shows how men beg for love and quickly lose interest in their partners once they are stuck in a relationship.

Touted as a "Male Bridget Jones" and a "Korean 500 Days of Summer", the insightful love story tracks the hero's bumbling journey through modern dating, which turns out to be a lot harder than he thought. "The film is hopefully everything that a man can experience in love," said Jeon, "in two hours" (of running time).

Soundtrack

Release

Box office 
Ticket sales surpassed expectations, reaching 1 million viewers in only 5 days of release, and breaking even on the 8th day. It was the 16th most-watched Korean film in 2012, at 1,726,202 admissions.

Critical reception 
The film is unique in that it unfolds 100% from Joo-wol's perspective, thus Jeon anticipated some negative feedback from women, saying Gong did have several problems with the story, but the film is his "response to those concerns." Several female moviegoers who attended advance screenings expressed their discomfort after watching it, flooding the blogosphere with their voices against the quasi-universal praise from the press. Jeon said, "Reality can be ragged, pathetic and desperate," adding that he expected the audience to ask why they have to watch that sad truth on the silver screen instead of a fairy tale with a prince charming. Whereas most Korean films present a more positive and less nuanced picture of love, the film highlights the challenges in romantic relationships. The Korea Times describes the film as "a perplexing tribute to love, a brutally honest portrayal of its progressive steps — from courtship to fizzling out. It is a satire of the bachelor social ladder, on top of which sit three-piece suits and white gowns while the rock bottom is occupied by poor artists. It is a story of a writer's block, which the protagonist hopes to overcome with a muse. It is a story of the man in its unpasteurized form: that needy, selfish and affection-seeking part of the human male species taking shape as the protagonist."

Awards and nominations

References

External links 
  
 
 
 

2012 films
2012 romantic comedy films
South Korean romantic comedy films
Films about writers
Films set in Seoul
Films set in Berlin
Films shot in Seoul
Films directed by Jeon Kye-soo
Next Entertainment World films
2010s Korean-language films
2010s South Korean films